The 1946 Pacific Tigers football team was an American football team that represented the College of the Pacific—now known as the University of the Pacific—in Stockton, California as a member of the California Collegiate Athletic Association (CCAA) during the 1946 college football season. They had previously competed in the Far Western Conference (FWC) from 1925 to 1942 and as an independent from 1943 to 1945. In their 14th and final season under head coach Amos Alonzo Stagg, the Tigers compiled a record of 4–7 with mark of 2–2 in conference play, tying for second place in the CCAA. At the end of the season, the Tigers were invited to the first, and only Optimist Bowl in Houston, where they lost to North Texas State Teachers. The Tigers played home games at Baxter Stadium in Stockton.

Schedule

References

Pacific
Pacific Tigers football seasons
Pacific Tigers football